Jermaine Johnson may refer to:

Jermaine Johnson II (born 1999), American football player
Jermaine Johnson (basketball) (born 1985), American politician, political advisor and basketball player 
Jermaine Johnson (footballer) (born 1980), Jamaican footballer